Kregg Lumpkin (born May 15, 1984) is a former American football running back. He was signed by the Green Bay Packers as an undrafted free agent in 2008. He played college football at Georgia.

Lumpkin also played for the Tampa Bay Buccaneers and Seattle Seahawks.

Lumpkin now works for Newton County Fire Department in Newton County, Georgia

College career
A highly recruited tailback prospect (#2 by Scout and Rivals.com, behind only Reggie Bush), Lumpkin played at the University of Georgia from 2003 to 2007. Slowed down by injuries during his sophomore and senior seasons along with sharing carries with Michael Cooper, Thomas Brown, Danny Ware, and Knowshon Moreno, Lumpkin rushed for 1,699 yards on 352 carries with 17 total touchdowns (14 rushing, 3 receiving) in his career. His jersey number as a true freshman was #28, but he changed it during his redshirt sophomore season to #6.

Professional career

Green Bay Packers
He was signed by the Green Bay Packers as an undrafted free agent in 2008. He made the regular season roster after an impressive training camp. He was placed on injured reserve on October 11. He was released on September 5, 2009 after final cuts and re-signed to the practice squad the following day. On January 11, 2010, he signed a reserve future contract.

Lumpkin was released on September 4, 2010.

Tampa Bay Buccaneers
On September 5, 2010, Lumpkin was claimed off waivers by the Tampa Bay Buccaneers.

Seattle Seahawks
Lumpkin signed with the Seattle Seahawks on March 23, 2012. He was waived on September 18.

New York Giants
Lumpkin signed with the New York Giants on November 27, 2012.

References

External links
Georgia Bulldogs bio 
Green Bay Packers bio 

1984 births
Living people
Sportspeople from Albany, Georgia
Players of American football from Georgia (U.S. state)
American football running backs
Georgia Bulldogs football players
Green Bay Packers players
Tampa Bay Buccaneers players
Seattle Seahawks players
New York Giants players